The Last Stand is a 2013 American action thriller film directed by South Korean film director Kim Jee-woon in his American directorial debut. The film stars Arnold Schwarzenegger in the lead role, Forest Whitaker, Johnny Knoxville, Rodrigo Santoro, Jaimie Alexander, Luis Guzmán, Eduardo Noriega, Peter Stormare, Zach Gilford and Genesis Rodriguez and was written by Andrew Knauer. This was Arnold Schwarzenegger's first lead acting role since Terminator 3: Rise of the Machines in 2003. The film focuses on a tough small town sheriff and his deputies who must stop a dangerous drug lord from escaping to Mexico in a modified sports car.

Filming took place in Belen, New Mexico and Nevada in late 2011. The film premiered on January 14, 2013, at Grauman's Chinese Theatre and was released on January 18, 2013, by Lionsgate, receiving mixed reviews from critics and grossing $48.3 million worldwide against a $45 million budget.

Plot
Sheriff Ray Owens resigns himself to a life of crime-fighting in the sleepy border town of Sommerton Junction, Arizona. He left his LAPD post following a bungled operation and leaving him wracked with failure and defeat after his partner was crippled and his team decimated. The crimes experienced in Sommerton range from the Mayor parking his Camaro in the fire lane to vintage arms collector Lewis Dinkum firing off guns at slabs of meat with the deputies. One night, Gabriel Cortez, an international drug lord and race car driver makes a daring escape from FBI custody in Las Vegas and speeds off in a modified Chevrolet Corvette C6 ZR1, taking Agent Ellen Richards as his hostage as he races southbound toward Mexico at speeds over 200 mph. 

Agent John Bannister has a blockade set up in Bullhead City, Arizona, but Cortez's men mow down the cops on site and clear the road for him to continue his getaway. Cortez also uses his extraordinary driving skills to immobilize two SWAT vehicles headed toward Summerton Junction. Before flying to Arizona, Agent Bannister has his team do a financial background check on all agents involved to learn about the mole, who has helped Cortez's escape. At 4:30 A.M, Owens dispatches deputies Jerry Bailey and Sarah Torrance to visit the residence of the local farmer Parsons, who has suddenly missed his usual milk delivery at the diner. After discovering that Parsons has been murdered, the deputies follow a trail of tire tracks that lead them to Cortez's henchman Thomas Burrell and his mercenary cutthroats, who are planting a mobile assault bridge across the canyon that marks the U.S./Mexico border. 

Bailey is fatally shot in the middle of a shootout between the deputies and the thugs before Owens rushes in to bring his officers back to his precinct. Shortly after being notified by Agent Bannister of Cortez's presence, Owens gathers Torrance and senior Deputy Mike "Figgy" Figuerola. He also deputizes jailed local Frank Martinez, a former US Marine who is a veteran of the Iraq War with PTSD who developed a streak of never finishing what he started; because Bailey was his friend, Martinez insists that he will not falter. Finally, Owens recruits Dinkum to protect their town. Dinkum agrees only if he becomes a deputy and if he keeps the gun Owens had confiscated earlier. At 7:10 A.M., Owens and his deputies, equipped with weapons from Dinkum's private museum, have the town's main road barricaded with cars when Burrell and his men arrive, prompting a lengthy firefight. Armed with a Tommy gun, Figuerola holds off the thugs before being injured by a sniper. 

Owens and Dinkum mow down a majority of the thugs with a Vickers machine gun mounted on the back of a school bus with Martinez providing cover fire, while Torrance snipes several gunmen on the rooftops. After Owens kills Burrell, Cortez's Corvette eventually arrives in town, veering past the barricade as Owens and the deputies shoot it. Cortez ejects Agent Richards from the car before speeding through a corn field. Suddenly, he encounters the mayor's Camaro commandeered by Owens before both cars collide with a swather. A dazed Cortez continues his escape on foot, but Owens meets him at the bridge. Owens ignores Cortez's bribe offers before both men fight each other. Despite sustaining slashes and stab wounds from Cortez's push dagger, Owens defeats Cortez and handcuffs him before dragging him back into town using the battered and now roofless Camaro. 

Agent Bannister arrives to take Cortez back into custody and arrests Agent Richards for taking a bribe from Cortez and aiding in his escape. Deputies Figuerola and Dinkum are taken to the hospital to be treated for their wounds. Martinez turns in the deputy's badge, Bailey's badge, that Owens had given him earlier. Owens tells him to keep it, as he earned it. As the Mayor sees what is left of his Camaro, Owens warns him about parking in the fire lane before he, Torrance and Martinez walk into the diner.

Cast

Production
In June 2009, producer Lorenzo di Bonaventura and studio Lionsgate pre-emptively picked up Andrew Knauer's spec script for The Last Stand. Back then, the script involved Cortez escaping with a Gumpert Apollo. One year later, South Korean director Kim Jee-woon became attached to the project. di Bonaventura stated that Jee-woon was invited because he felt that in his filmography he "makes the simple feel rich". Kim in turn declared that he was attracted to the plot of "protecting something important, no matter how small", and having advanced technology being taken down in "analogue ways". Writer Jeffrey Nachmanoff was also brought in to rewrite the script, which di Bonaventura compared the film to a Western film, with a small town being attacked by an analogue to a corrupt cattle baron and a weathered veteran trying to stop him.

Liam Neeson was considered for the protagonist, but after he passed in 2011 Lionsgate offered the project to Arnold Schwarzenegger, who had just ended his tenure as Governor of California. He was announced on The Last Stand in July 2011. The actor said he considered the project "a lot different for me, even though it's action-packed, because I have to play a guy who's sensitive to my team. And we have lots of laughs like in True Lies." Jee-woon was at first apprehensive to have such a big star in the project, but once both discussed the project he noticed both had the same ideas for Ray Owens, aiming for an everyman instead of a "Terminator like feel". Two weeks later, Lionsgate announced a release date of January 18, 2013.

Filming started on October 17, 2011 in Belen, New Mexico and Nevada. Sommerton was required to be a border town, and Jee-woon also wanted a city that represented "Small Town America". Belen was eventually chosen for having an abandoned area that could be used by the production company for as long as they needed it. Two existing buildings became landmarks of Sommerton, the local hotel and a condemned building that became the diner. Six vacant lots were filled with façades, in which production designer Franco-Giacomo Carbone tried to put a mixture of styles to heighten the appearance of a frontier city with much history. While the producers originally wanted to actually film in Downtown Las Vegas, they eventually found that downtown Albuquerque was visually similar and opted to film there instead, adding the Las Vegas Strip in the background during post-production. The town allowed filming from 6 p.m. to 6 a.m., which did not interrupt local businesses. Jee-woon aimed to "create a distinct look and change the style for every space", with the chaotic environment of the FBI having cold tones and a smarter ambiance, and Sommerton having a "peaceful small town feeling" heightened by warm colors such as yellow and orange.

Given that di Bonaventura had a previous history with General Motors producing Transformers, the company provided them with the required muscle cars. For Cortez' escape car, a Chevrolet Corvette C6 ZR1 was picked for being advertised as "the fastest car in a straight line ever made". Eventually, a Camaro was provided for the car that Owens drove during the chase. Seven cars of each model were provided by Chevrolet, with two being returned in pristine shape. The others had varied changes: some had an automated driving system built atop them for the scenes shot from inside the car, others were reinforced for collisions, and a few ended up mounted on rigs - with the Camaro dragged atop the Corvette having all its insides removed to make it lighter. A 24-acre cornfield outside Albuquerque was purchased to serve as the scenery for the climactic chase at the end, and that field was later added to the background of the Sommerton scenes. The chase had the problem of a snowstorm shortly before filming, which made the ground muddy and hard to drive on.

On December 17, 2011, shooting of the film was briefly interrupted, but on January 3, 2012, it continued. The processing ended February 2, 2012, and the subsequent post-production continued in Los Angeles.

Release
The Last Stand had its premiere on January 14, 2013, at Grauman's Chinese Theatre. The film was released worldwide on January 17, 2013, and in North America the following day.

Reception

Box office
The film ranked at number 9 on its debut weekend, taking in $6.3 million. Its theatrical run ended having grossed $12.1 million in America and $36.2 million in other territories for a total gross of $48.3 million. Lionsgate released it on home video in the US on May 21, 2013.

Critical response
The site's consensus reads: "There's nothing particularly distinguished about it, but for Schwarzenegger fans The Last Stand provides perfectly undemanding entertainment." Metacritic rated it 54 out of 100 based on 33 critics, indicating "mixed or average reviews".

According to Entertainment Weekly critic Owen Gleiberman, "the picture is much better than its promos suggest. It's a crackerjack B movie worthy of comparison to such stylishly low-down, smart-meets-dumb, hyper-violent entertainments as the 1997 Kurt Russell thriller Breakdown, Clint Eastwood's infamous police bloodbath The Gauntlet, John Carpenter's original Assault on Precinct 13, and Arnold's own overlooked 1986 outing Raw Deal...[Schwarzenegger] gives a controlled and brutally charismatic performance that restores his dignity as a star. He proves — and this is the last thing I was expecting — that there's life after the Governator."

IGN editor Jim Vejvoda rated the film 6 out of 10 and wrote, "The movie's shortcomings are clear whenever anyone is required to speak or act. That may not be the reason why most viewers will go to see The Last Stand, but it's grating enough to chip away at the overall enjoyment of the film. The Last Stand is a formulaic action flick, but it still delivers enough decent car stunts, shoot-outs and fistfights to warrant a look-see for Arnold fans."

Richard Roeper enjoyed the film, giving it three stars out of four and stating, "If you've got violent-movie fatigue, and you're too exhausted from real-life carnage on the news to enjoy an R-rated blood-fest in which a number of kills are executed as deliberately funny visual punchlines, you do not want to go anywhere near this film. But if you're a fan of stylish, relentlessly loud shootouts, questionable plot developments be damned, this is your ticket to weekend escapism."

See also
 List of American films of 2013
 Arnold Schwarzenegger filmography

References

External links
 
 
 
 
 
 
 
 

2013 films
2013 action thriller films
2013 Western (genre) films
American action thriller films
American chase films
American police detective films
Di Bonaventura Pictures films
Fictional portrayals of the Las Vegas Metropolitan Police Department
Films about Mexican drug cartels
Films directed by Kim Jee-woon
Films produced by Lorenzo di Bonaventura
Films set in Bullhead City, Arizona
Films set in the Las Vegas Valley
Films set in Los Angeles
Films set in Nevada
Films set in New Mexico
Lionsgate films
Neo-Western films
2010s English-language films
2010s American films
2010s Mexican films